NDTDI is a tricyclic tryptamine derivative which is thought to act as a serotonin receptor agonist, though its pharmacology has not been studied in detail. It is a structurally simplified analogue of LSD and is reported to retain similar effects, though with many times lower potency. It has been sold as a designer drug since 2016 and was first identified by a forensic laboratory in Slovenia in 2017.

Legality
NDTDI was made illegal in Latvia in March 2017.

See also
 4,5-DHP-DMT
 Bay R 1531
 RU-28306
 RU-24,969

References 

Serotonin receptor agonists